South West Devon is a constituency represented in the House of Commons of the UK Parliament since 1997 by Sir Gary Streeter, a Conservative.

Boundaries

1997–2010: The District of South Hams wards of Bickleigh and Shaugh, Brixton, Charterlands, Cornwood and Harford, Erme Valley, Ivybridge, Modbury, Newton and Noss, Sparkwell, Ugborough, Wembury, and Yealmpton, the City of Plymouth wards of Plympton Erle, Plympton St Mary, Plymstock Dunstone, and Plymstock Radford, and the Borough of West Devon ward of Buckland Monachorum.

2010–present: The District of South Hams wards of Bickleigh and Shaugh, Charterlands, Cornwood and Sparkwell, Erme Valley, Ivybridge Central, Ivybridge Filham, Ivybridge Woodlands, Newton and Noss, Wembury and Brixton, and Yealmpton, and the City of Plymouth wards of Plympton Chaddlewood, Plympton Erle, Plympton St Mary, Plymstock Dunstone, and Plymstock Radford.

The constituency is a south-western portion of Devon and includes the easternmost part of the city of Plymouth, namely the suburban small towns of Plympton (which as the borough constituency of Plympton Erle returned its own MPs until the Reform Act of 1832 abolished the seat as a 'rotten borough') and Plymstock which are so close as to be contiguous with the city's eastern parts, as well as the town of Ivybridge and much of the South Hams. Its landscape includes the edge of Dartmoor and a southern coastline.

History
The areas covered in the seat were previously served by the South Hams and Plymouth Sutton seats.  Both seats had been represented by the Conservative Party, and Gary Streeter, who became the first MP for the new constituency in 1997, had been MP for Plymouth Sutton from 1992 until 1997.

Constituency profile
Unemployment, at 1.3% in November 2012, was significantly lower than the national average of 3.8%.

Members of Parliament

Elections

Elections in the 2010s

Elections in the 2000s

Elections in the 1990s

See also 
 List of parliamentary constituencies in Devon

Notes

References

Parliamentary constituencies in Devon
Constituencies of the Parliament of the United Kingdom established in 1997